Henricus is a genus of moths belonging to the family Tortricidae.

Species

Henricus acosmetes (Razowski, 1986)
Henricus ademonia (Clarke, 1968)
Henricus ateleutus Razowski, 1991
Henricus attalus Razowski, 1994
Henricus bibelonus Razowski & Becker, 2007
Henricus bleptus Razowski & Becker, 2007
Henricus ceramocerus Razowski, 1999
Henricus cerussatus Razowski & Wojtusiak, 2006
Henricus charagus Razowski, 1991
Henricus chriograptus Razowski, 1999
Henricus chroicopterus Razowski, 1991
Henricus cognata (Walsingham, 1914)
Henricus comes (Walsingham, 1884)
Henricus contrastana (Kearfott, 1907)
Henricus cristobalicus Razowski, 1999
Henricus cuspis Razowski & Becker, 2007
Henricus edwardsiana (Walsingham, 1884)
Henricus ellampus Razowski, 1992
Henricus exploratus Razowski & Becker, 1986
Henricus exsanguis Razowski, 1994
Henricus flebilis Razowski, 1994
Henricus fuscodorsana (Kearfott, 1904)
Henricus generosus Razowski, 1994
Henricus glaesarius Razowski & Wojtusiak, 2006
Henricus hemitelius Razowski, 1991
Henricus icogramma (Clarke, 1968)
Henricus improvisus Razowski & Becker, 1986
Henricus inanimalis Razowski & Becker, 1986
Henricus inchoatus Razowski & Becker, 1986
Henricus infernalis (Heinrich, 1920)
Henricus insolitus Razowski & Becker, 1986
Henricus inspergatus Razowski & Becker, 1986
Henricus macrocarpana (Walsingham, 1895)
Henricus melanoleuca (Clarke, 1968)
Henricus metalliferus Razowski & Pelz, 2001
Henricus montanus Razowski & Wojtusiak, 2006
Henricus montuosus Razowski & Becker, 2002
Henricus ophryodes (Meyrick, 1927)
Henricus palimpsestus Razowski & Becker, 1986
Henricus pampasianus Razowski & Wojtusiak, 2008
Henricus paredrus Razowski, 1991
Henricus parmulus Razowski, 1991
Henricus perissus Razowski & Becker, 2007
Henricus platanillanus Razowski & Becker, 2007
Henricus platina (Clarke, 1968)
Henricus powelli Razowski, 1984
Henricus rhiobursa Razowski, 1991
Henricus rubrograptus Razowski, 1991
Henricus sangayanus Razowski & Wojtusiak, 2009
Henricus tenerima (Razowski, 1986)
Henricus tingomariae Razowski & Wojtusiak, 2010
Henricus turbula (Clarke, 1968)
Henricus umbrabasana (Kearfott, 1908)
Henricus zelotes Razowski & Becker, 1986

See also
List of Tortricidae genera

References

 , 2005: World catalogue of insects volume 5 Tortricidae.
 , 1943, Bull. S. Calif. Acad. Sci. 39: 103.
 , 2011: Diagnoses and remarks on genera of Tortricidae, 2: Cochylini (Lepidoptera: Tortricidae). Shilap Revista de Lepidopterologia 39 (156): 397–414.
 , 2006: Tortricidae (Lepidoptera) from the Valley of Río Gualaceo, East Cordillera in Ecuador, with descriptions of new taxa. Acta Zoologica Cracoviensia 49B (1-2): 17–53. Full article:  
 , 2006: Tortricidae from Venezuela (Lepidoptera: Tortricidae). Shilap Revista de Lepidopterologia 34 (133): 35-79 
 , 2008: Tortricidae from the mountains of Ecuador. Part III. Western Cordillera (Insecta: Lepidoptera). Genus 19 (3): 497–575. Full article: 
 , 2009: Tortricidae (Lepidoptera) from the mountains of Ecuador and remarks on their geographical distribution. Part IV. Eastern Cordillera. Acta Zoologica Cracoviensia 51B (1-2): 119–187. . Full article:  .
 , 2010: Tortricidae (Lepidoptera) from Peru. Acta Zoologica Cracoviensia 53B (1-2): 73-159. . Full article:  .

External links
tortricidae.com

 
Cochylini
Tortricidae genera